Al-Thawabit al-Wataniyya, shortened as Thawabit ('fundamental principles') and sometimes referred to as Palestinian red-lines, are a set of supra-constitutional principles that were formulated by the Palestinian National Council of the Palestinian Liberation Organization (PLO) in 1977, representing the core issues of national consensus on the Israeli–Palestinian conflict and "to which all Palestinian factions must pledge fealty": including the right to resistance, the right to self-determination (statehood), Jerusalem as the capital of Palestine, and the right of Palestinian refugees to return (in accordance with UNGA 194).

The Thawabit, declared as Palestinians' inviolable national rights, became the cornerstones of the ethos of conflict of the Palestinian society, featuring prominently in all cultural products, in the media, in the speeches of leaders, in official documents, in textbooks and in the daily life of the Palestinian society.

See also
 Sumud
 Palestinian National Covenant
 PLO's Ten Point Program

References

Palestine Liberation Organization
Palestinian nationalism
Palestinian culture
Israeli–Palestinian conflict